Blepharotes coriarius, the giant yellow robber fly, is a robber fly from Australia in the family Asilidae. 
It is 45 mm. in length. It was described by the German naturalist Christian Rudolph Wilhelm Wiedemann in 1830.

Insects of Australia
Asilidae
Insects described in 1830